Kubikenborgs IF is a Swedish football club located in Kubikenborg, Sundsvall.

Background
Kubikenborgs Idrottsförening were founded in 1919 and granted land to develop a stadium a year later.  The sports specialised in a range of sports including soccer, hockey, figure skating, speed skating, table tennis, mini golf, ski jumping, cross country skiing and handball. They now only run a football programme.

Since their foundation Kubikenborgs IF has participated mainly in the middle  divisions of the Swedish football league system.  Their best period was in the early 1970s when they spent two seasons in Division 2 which was then the second tier of Swedish football. The club currently plays in Division 3 Mellersta Norrland which is the fifth tier of Swedish football. They play their home matches at the Kubikenborgs IP in Sundsvall.  An attendance record of 3,324 was set in 1953.

Kubikenborgs IF are affiliated to the Medelpads Fotbollförbund.  The club were runners-up in the Norrländska Mästerskapet in 1936 having lost 5–0 to Bodens BK in the final.

Season to season

Attendances

In recent seasons Kubikenborgs IF have had the following average attendances:

Footnotes

External links
 Kubikenborgs IF – Official website
 Kubikenborgs IF Facebook

Sport in Sundsvall
Football clubs in Västernorrland County
Association football clubs established in 1919
1919 establishments in Sweden